The Stolpersteine in the Kraj Vysočina lists the Stolpersteine in the Vysočina Region  ("Highlands Region") in the south-east of Bohemia. Stolpersteine is the German name for stumbling blocks collocated all over Europe by German artist Gunter Demnig. They remember the fate of the Nazi victims being murdered, deported, exiled or driven to suicide.

Generally, the stumbling blocks are posed in front of the building where the victims had their last self chosen residence. The name of the Stolpersteine in Czech is: Kameny zmizelých, stones of the disappeared.

The lists are sortable; the basic order follows the alphabet according to the last name of the victim.

Chotěboř 

The names of all three victims of the Schenkel family can also be found on a monument for the victims of WW2 located in the Krále Jana, the King John park in the center of Chotěboř.

Havlíčkův Brod

Jihlava

Pacov

Senožaty

Třebíč

Žirovnice

Dates of collocations 

The Stolpersteine in the Kraj Vysočina were collocated by the artist himself on the following dates:
 18 July 2013: Třebíč 
 14 September 2014: Pacov
 15 September 2014: Havlíčkův Brod
 3 August 2015: Senožaty 
 3 August 2016: Chotěboř
 4 August 2016: Žirovnice
 14 August 2018: Jihlava

The collocations in Chotěboř were initiated by Markéta Kadlecová.

The Czech Stolperstein project was initiated in 2008 by the Česká unie židovské mládeže (Czech Union of Jewish Youth) and was realized with the patronage of the Mayor of Prague.

See also 
 List of cities by country that have stolpersteine
 Stolpersteine in the Czech Republic

External links

 stolpersteine.eu, Demnig's website
 holocaust.cz Czech databank of Holocaust victims
 Stolpersteine in Teplice
 Interview with Susanna Urbanová The last Jewish survivor of Třebíč talks about her father Arnošt Beneš, murdered by the Nazis, about the Jewish quarter of her home town and about the Nazi occupation. 1 h 4 m, in Czech

References

Vysočina